Desert Dolphins was a Canadian country music group. Their 1994 single "Dynamite" reached the Top 10 of the RPM Country Tracks chart. They later returned to the Top 20 with their 1996 single "Foolproof."

The band was founded in 1993 in Kitchener, Ontario. Its original lineup was Grant Heywood (lead vocals, mandolin), Peter Padalino (guitar, keyboards, vocals), Rocky Howell (guitar, vocals), and Jamie Todd (various instruments). Padalino was a former member of Major Hoople's Boarding House. By mid-1995, the lineup had changed to Heywood, Peter Beacock (keyboards), Sean Gilders (bass guitar), and Daniel Davies (guitars). Randall Prescott of the band Prescott-Brown produced their album.

Discography

Albums

Singles

Music videos

References

Canadian country music groups
Musical groups from Kitchener, Ontario
Musical groups established in 1993